Patrick Beattie Mynhardt (12 June 1932 in Bethulie, Free State, South Africa – 25 October 2007 in London, England) was a well-known South African film and theatre actor. He appeared in over 150 stage plays in South Africa and England, 100 local and international films, TV plays and serials as well as an opera. He died in London, where he was performing in his one-man show Boy from Bethulie at the Jermyn Street Theatre in the West End.

Early life 
The son of Johannes Tobias Mynhardt, a district surgeon and Elizabeth Beattie, an Irish emigrant, Patrick was born in Bethulie in the Free State. He matriculated from De La Salle College in East London. He studied drama at Rhodes University before joining the National Theatre Organisation in 1953 and touring South Africa. In 1954, he moved to London to attend the Central School of Speech and Drama. Performing on stage and for the BBC in Britain, he worked with actors including Peter Sellers, Burt Lancaster, Anthony Quinn, Richard Harris, Peter O'Toole, Michael Caine and Judi Dench. At the end of 1960 he returned to South Africa.

Partial filmography 

 Vadertjie Langbeen (1955) – Barry Cilliers
 Nor the Moon by Night (1958) – Jim (uncredited)
 The Hellions (1961) – Telegraph Operator
 As Ons Twee Eers Getroud Is! (1962) – Columnist, 'Ware Liefde'
 Stropers van die Laeveld (1962)
 Seven Against the Sun (1964) – Pte. Peters
 The Naked Prey (1965) – Safari Overseer / Slave Dealer / Irish Soldier
 Diamond Walkers (1965) – Kelly
 Der Rivonia-Prozess (1966) – Sergeant Dirker
 Africa Shakes (1966) – Clumsy waiter (uncredited)
 Kavaliers (1966) – Col. Dart
 The Cape Town Affair (1967) – Detective Myburgh (uncredited)
 The Jackals (1967) – Gotz
 Majuba: Heuwel van Duiwe (1968) – Rolf du Toit
 Vrolike Vrydag 13de (1969) – Harry Holt
 Petticoat Safari (1969)
 Lied in My Hart (1970) – Oskar Lichtenstein
 Scotty & Co. (1970) – Landdrost de Jager
 Jannie Tot Siens (1970) – George
 Shangani Patrol (1970) – Lt. Arend Hofmeyr
 Pressure Burst (1971) – Ollie Olwagen
 Three Bullets for a Long Gun (1971) – Hawkeye
 Z.E.B.R.A. (1971) – Charles Lester
 Die Voortrekkers (1973) – Piet Retief
 Die Saboteurs (1974)
 Forever Young, Forever Free (1975) – Doctor Du Toit
 Olie Kolonie (1975)
 Kniediep... (1975) – Valentine
 One Away (1976) – Chief Warder
 Thaba (1977) – André Grobbelaar
 Les Diamants du président (1977, TV Mini-Series)
 Target of an Assassin (1977)
 Zulu Dawn (1979) – Col. Harness
 A Game for Vultures (1979) – Hennie Muller
 Pour tout l'or du Transvaal (1979,TV Mini-Series) – Hasenfeld
 Gräset sjunger (1981) – Charlie Muller
 Torn Allegiance (1984) – du Toit
 Broer Matie (1984) – Jurie
 Skollie (1984) – Pappa
 Eendag vir Altyd (1985) – Oom Jurie
 The Lion's Share (1985) – The Boss
 Vyfster: Die Slot (1986) – Pappa (Paul Williams)
 Scavengers (1988) – Pavloski
 The Emissary (1988) – Brochard
 A Private Life (1989) – Uncle Bob
 Oddball Hall (1990) – Otto
 The Fourth Reich (1990) – Parliamentarian
 Orkney Snork Nie! (die movie): 'Dis Lekker By Die See''' (1992) – Harry Vermaas
 The Visual Bible: Matthew (1993) – Herod Senior
 A Good Man in Africa (1994) – Muller
 Lipstiek Dipstiek (1994) – Oom Disselboom
 Hearts & Minds (1995) – Police general 1
 Suburban Bliss (1996, TV Series) – Hempies (1996)
 Operation Delta Force 2: Mayday (1997, TV Movie) – Vladimir Pasenko
 Pride of Africa (1997, TV Movie) – Hertzberg
 Cold Stone Jug (2003, TV Movie) – Herman Bosman
 Stander'' (2003) – Judge (final film role)

References

External links

 Official site
 Fifty years of Patrick Mynhardt
 Remembering Patrick Mynhardt
 Patrick Mynhardt, remembered fondly
 Final curtain for Patrick Mynhardt
 Actor Patrick Mynhardt dies
 Patrick Mynhardt passes away in London
 Patrick Mynhardt at Who's Who
 Patrick Mynhardt 'was Magic'
 Tributes pour in for actor Patrick Mynhardt
South Africa says Hamba Kahle to 3 famous South Africans
Lucky and Patrick: Tale of two friends

South African male film actors
1932 births
2007 deaths
Rhodes University alumni
South African people of Irish descent
Alumni of the Royal Central School of Speech and Drama
South African male stage actors
South African expatriates in the United Kingdom